"Trippin' on Us" is the debut single released by Canadian country music singer Lindsay Ell. The song was written by Ell with David Fanning and Vicky McGehee. "Trippin' on Us" was released to digital retailers through Stoney Creek Records on November 5, 2013. It was serviced to American country radio on December 16, 2013, and was the most-added single that week.

Critical reception
Billy Dukes of Taste of Country wrote that "Trippin' on Us" lets Ell "shine as a singer and storyteller," and that her unassuming but confident delivery "gives depth to a simple love story."

Chart performance
"Trippin' on Us" entered the Canada Country airplay chart in December 2013 and reached a peak position of 14 on the chart dated March 8, 2014. The song also debuted and peaked at number 95 on the Canadian Hot 100 chart dated March 8, 2014. As of 2017, it remains Ell's only Hot 100 hit. In the United States, "Trippin' on Us" debuted at number 58 on the Billboard Country Airplay chart dated January 25, 2014. It reached a peak position of 46 on the chart dated March 8, 2014.

Music video
The official music video for "Trippin' on Us" premiered February 23, 2014. Directed by Roman White, the video tells the love story of Ell and a "tall, dark, and handsome" love interest.

Charts

Release history

References

2013 songs
2013 debut singles
Songs written by Lindsay Ell
Songs written by Vicky McGehee
Songs written by David Fanning (singer)
BBR Music Group singles
Lindsay Ell songs